Barclay Hills Education Center is an alternative public school located within the Parchment Public School District, Parchment, Michigan.  This school enrolls students in grades sixth through twelfth from surrounding areas.

External links
 Barclay Hills Education Center

Public middle schools in Michigan
Public high schools in Michigan
Schools in Kalamazoo County, Michigan